Szabadkígyós is a village in Békés County, in the Southern Great Plain region of south-east Hungary.

Geography
It covers an area of 45.56 km² and has a population of 2434 people (2015).

Gallery

References

Populated places in Békés County
Palaces in Hungary